The Korean Friendship Association (KFA) is a Spain- friendship association with North Korea. The KFA was established in November 2000. It claims to have official representatives in 34 countries. The KFA was designated 'North Korean state controlled media' by Facebook.

Its president, Spanish citizen Alejandro Cao de Benós de Les y Pérez, is the only person paid a salary. Fees collected by the KFA are generally deposited in accounts in his name around Europe.

Activities
Compared with other North Korea friendship associations, the KFA is more radical.

The KFA pages provide North Korean related material, including tourism tips and political essays, and it is possible to hear views from a North Korean perspective. The KFA Forum site is hosted and administered in Europe and gives links to Korean language teaching sites.

The KFA denies violations of human rights in North Korea and disputes the existence of North Korean concentration camps.  

The objectives of the KFA are to promote the well-being of all members and to promote friendship between members of the KFA worldwide.

Objectives
The stated objectives of the KFA are:
 Show the reality of North Korea to the world. 
 Defend the independence and socialist construction in North Korea. 
 Learn from the culture and history of the Korean People - Work for the peaceful unification of the Korean peninsula.

The KFA organizes travel delegations to North Korea. Travel is according to experts a primary motivation of membership in KFA: partakers in trips are offered privileged service.

Structure
The KFA is the largest friendship association with North Korea. It operates in 120 countries. There is an Official Delegate in 34 countries. The KFA is licensed by the North Korean government and is well-funded and supported. The organization is coordinated well "to a certain degree", according to NK News.

The national associations under the KFA do not receive official funding and operate "as far less than consulates, just slightly more than fan clubs". They do not have many functions to support the government of North Korea: they do not support the regime monetarily and do not gather intelligence.

Official Delegates are responsible for the activities in his/her country and secretaries appointed by the delegates. Above the Official Delegates, the "International Organization Committee" consisting of the President, the International Counselor and an International Organization Secretary who control and direct the activities of the KFA worldwide.
President: Alejandro Cao de Benós de Les y Pérez
International organization secretary: Mana Sapmak
International communication secretary: Carlos Luna
International Self-Elected Secretariat: Cory Ray Pope Giles-d'Leeuw
International commissar: Trever Aritz 
Some of the most active members are Dermot Hudson, the Official Delegate in the United Kingdom who has been a part of KFA since its beginning, and Trevor Spencer, the Official Delegate in Canada who is an active political writer and commentator.
Only one person has four countries as Zone delegate, Ulrich Larsen from Denmark. Larsen is the Zone delegate in Scandinavia, meaning that he is in charge of Denmark, Finland, Norway, and Sweden. Larsen is known for making films about North Korea on YouTube for propaganda use. In October 2020 it was unveiled that Larsen has been working undercover in the KFA for ten years to uncover the secret criminal activities that North Korea and Alejandro Cao de Benós are using the KFA for. Both Hudson and Larsen have been awarded medals by the North Korean government.

Criticism
NK News describes the KFA as "one of the DPRK's primary tools of soft power within its global propaganda network".

In 2005 journalist David Scofield of Asia Times called members of KFA "useful idiots" and described the organization as follows:

The group's activities include "information" seminars where the enlightened benevolence of Kim's rule is championed, all part of its "alternative" view of the North. The ragged wretched displays of poverty and starvation are edited out and the voice of North Koreans not in the direct employ of Kim Jong-il are conspicuously absent. In place of uncomfortable reality, the KFA offers vacation photos of "their" North Korea taken during recent, state-supported visits, complete with bowling, golf, amusement parks and Karaoke with young female party members. Members write glowing pieces, oblations celebrating Kim Jong-il's wise rule. No starving people, torture, summary execution, penury or despair in the Korean Friendship Association's North Korea. Just golf, great meals and evenings in the company of Kim Jong-il's beauties.

A 2015 investigation by NK News found the commercial practices and integrity of the KFA to be in question.

According to Hazel Smith of Cranfield University, KFA associations have lost much of their original role as part of an international socialist movement. Today, they are reduced to serving domestic purposes of North Korea.

On 11 October 2020 it was revealed that the KFA delegate for the Scandinavian countries, Ulrich Larsen, had been working as a mole within KFA for ten years with the explicit purpose to expose the North Korean regime's shadow economy, including production and sale of armaments and narcotics, and how Alejandro Cao de Benós uses the organization to facilitate these activities. This exposé is the subject of the 2020 documentary The Mole - Undercover in North Korea.

See also

 Politics of North Korea
 Propaganda in North Korea
 Cultural diplomacy
 Public diplomacy
 Chongryon
 Swedish-Korean Association
 British Council
 Alliance Française

References

External links
 

Spanish friendship associations
Organizations established in 2000
2000 establishments in Spain
Korea friendship associations
North Korea–Spain relations
Organizations specializing in North Korean issues